Charles Randolph Hubbard (August 20, 1849 – March 28, 1923) was an American archer who competed in the 1904 Summer Olympics. He was born in Cincinnati, Ohio and died in Hamilton, Ohio. Hubbard won the silver medal in the team competition. In the Double American round he finished 11th.

References

External links

 profile

1849 births
1923 deaths
American male archers
Archers at the 1904 Summer Olympics
Olympic silver medalists for the United States in archery
Medalists at the 1904 Summer Olympics
Sportspeople from Cincinnati